Sengeløse is a town in the Høje-Taastrup Municipality in northeast Zealand, Denmark, about three kilometers northwest of Taastrup. As of 2022, it has a population of 1,491.

References 

Cities and towns in the Capital Region of Denmark
Høje-Taastrup Municipality